Chandrapur Super Thermal Power Station (often abbreviated as CSTPS) is a thermal power plant located in Chandrapur district in the Indian state of Maharashtra. The power plant is one of the coal based power plants of MAHAGENCO. The coal for the power plant is sourced from Durgapur and Padmapur Collieries of Western Coalfields Limited. The plant was officially inaugurated by the then Prime Minister Indira Gandhi on 8 October 1984.

With the total capacity of 3340MW, power plant in the Maharashtra. It accounts for more than 25% of Maharashtra's total needs. The plant gets water supply from Erai Dam when in normal conditions. In the summer of 2010 due to less water in Erai, the plant also got water supply from Chargaon Dam.

Capacity

Gallery

See also

 Make in Maharashtra

References

Coal-fired power stations in Maharashtra
Chandrapur district
Energy infrastructure completed in 1983
1983 establishments in Maharashtra
20th-century architecture in India